This is a list of the demographics of Martinique, a Caribbean island and an overseas department/region and single territorial collectivity of France.

Population
According to INSEE Martinique has an estimated population of 390,371 on January 1, 2012. Life expectancy at birth is 78.9 years for males and 84.8 for females (figures for 2011).

Ethnic groups
African Martinicans and African-white-Indian mixture 80%; Indo-Martiniquais 10%; White Martinicans 5%; Lebanese, Jewish, Syrian, and Chinese Martinicans comprise less than 5% of the population. Note that French government forbids ethnic censuses. Those numbers are not official and may be inaccurate.

Languages
French is the official language and is understood by the majority of the population. Martinican Creole, a form of Antillean Creole, is also spoken by most of the population.

Religion
Martinique's population is predominantly Christian, with 96.5% of Martinicans identifying as such. A much smaller number of Martinicans identify as unaffiliated with any religion, accounting for 2.3% of the population. Hinduism, Judaism, and Islam all have a presence on the island, each accounting for less than 1% of the population. Muslims account for 0.5% or 1751 person, out of population of 350,373.

Vital statistics

Structure of the population 

Structure of the population (01.01.2010) (Provisional estimates):

References

 
Society of Martinique